

Friedrich-Carl von Steinkeller (28 March 1896 – 19 October 1981) was a general in the Wehrmacht of Nazi Germany during World War II. He was a recipient of the Knight's Cross of the Iron Cross. Steinkeller surrendered to the Red Army forces in the course of the Soviet Mogilev Offensive in June 1944; he was released in 1955.

Awards 

 Knight's Cross of the Iron Cross on 31 March 1943 as Oberstleutnant and commander Panzergrenadier-Regiment 7

References

Bibliography

 

1896 births
1981 deaths
People from Wałcz
People from West Prussia
Major generals of the German Army (Wehrmacht)
Recipients of the Gold German Cross
Recipients of the Knight's Cross of the Iron Cross
German prisoners of war in World War II held by the Soviet Union